Turnabout Glacier is located on Ellesmere Island, Nunavut, Canada. It is drained by the Turnabout River.

The glacier, the river and Turnabout Lake were named in 1957–58 during the International Geophysical Year by the Hazen Camp party directed by Geoffrey Hattersley-Smith.

There is also a Turnabout Glacier in the Antarctica at 77° 46' S 160° 43' E.

See also
List of glaciers

References

Glaciers of Qikiqtaaluk Region
Ellesmere Island
Arctic Cordillera